Signore e signora is an Italian sitcom.

See also
List of Italian television series

External links
 

Italian comedy television series